Inga Korshunova is a Russian former pair skater. With Dmitry Saveliev, she won the 1993 1993 World Junior Championships and the 1992 Blue Swords. Silver Medalist at the 1993 Junior Russian Nationals.  They were coached by Valeriy Tiukov and Valentina Tiukova at SDIUSHOR Orlenok in Perm.

In 1994, she was awarded the title of Master of Sport of Russia by the Russian Figure Skating Federation.

References

Navigation

Russian female pair skaters
Living people
World Junior Figure Skating Championships medalists
Sportspeople from Perm, Russia
Year of birth missing (living people)